Lucien Didier (born 5 August 1950) is a former Luxembourgian cyclist. He competed at the 1972 Summer Olympics and the 1976 Summer Olympics. He rode in ten Grand Tours between 1978 and 1984, including six Tours de France. In each of his Tour starts he completed the race and helped his team leader to overall victory - Bernard Hinault four times and Laurent Fignon twice. He was the son-in law of racing cyclist Bim Diederich and is the father of racing cyclist Laurent Didier.

References

External links
 

1950 births
Living people
Luxembourgian male cyclists
Olympic cyclists of Luxembourg
Cyclists at the 1972 Summer Olympics
Cyclists at the 1976 Summer Olympics
Sportspeople from Luxembourg City